Paula Therese Hammond (born September 3, 1963) is a David H. Koch Professor in Engineering and the Head of the Department of Chemical Engineering at the Massachusetts Institute of Technology (MIT). She was the first woman and person of color appointed as head of the Chemical Engineering department. Her laboratory designs polymers and nanoparticles for drug delivery and energy-related applications including batteries and fuel cells.

Hammond has been the recipient of numerous awards and is a member of the National Academy of Medicine (2016), the National Academy of Engineering (2017, “for contributions to self-assembly of polyelectrolytes, colloids, and block copolymers at surfaces and interfaces for energy and healthcare applications”), the National Academy of Sciences (2019), and the National Academy of Inventors (2021).

She is an intramural faculty member of the Koch Institute for Integrative Cancer Research and an Associate Editor of ACS Nano.

Early life and education

Hammond was born in 1963 in Detroit, Michigan as Paula Therese Goodwin to parents Jesse Francis and Della Mae Goodwin (née McGraw).  Her father has a Ph.D in Biochemistry and her mother has a master's degree in nursing.

Goodwin graduated a year prior to her expected date at the Academy of the Sacred Heart in Bloomfield, Michigan in 1980. After graduation, Goodwin went on to study and earn a Bachelor of Science in Chemical Engineering from Massachusetts Institute of Technology (MIT) in 1984. After completing her bachelors, she went to work for Motorola for two years as a process engineer in the packaging of integrated circuits. She returned to academia and obtained a Master of Science in chemical engineering from the Georgia Institute of Technology in 1988. Hammond's master's thesis was on conducting elastomers for robotic tactile sensors. while working at Georgia Tech Research Institute as a research engineer.

In 1988, she returned to MIT to earn her Ph.D. in chemical engineering (granted in 1993). At MIT she worked under the supervision of Michael F. Rubner. Her Ph.D. thesis research focused on synthesizing polymers with mechanochromic properties. After completing her Ph.D., Hammond was a NSF Postdoctoral Fellow with George M. Whitesides in the chemistry department at Harvard University.

Research and career
In 1995 Hammond was appointed to Massachusetts Institute of Technology as an Assistant Professor.  Hammond and her lab uses understanding of secondary interactions to guide materials assembly at surfaces and in solution to design polymers and nanoparticles for applications in drug delivery; wound healing; and energy and fuel cells. Her work involves Layer by layer (LbL) assembly, which builds films of alternating positively and negatively charged molecules. Additionally, her lab works with nanoparticle drug carriers for targeted nanoparticle drug, gene, and siRNA delivery for cancer treatment as well as artificial polypeptides and polymeric nucleic acids to engage biology and build novel drug systems.

Medical applications

Hammond has developed "stealth polymers" to disguise cancer chemotherapeutics contained in nanoparticles so that they can reach tumors. She also works on ways to transport RNA into cells to either increase or decrease the expression of specific genes.

Hammond cofounded MIT's Institute for Soldier Nanotechnology, a partnership between MIT, the Army, and industry partners to develop nanotechnology to improve soldier "protection and survivability." As part of this program, Hammond designed a spray that helps blood clot to prevent blood loss.

Hammond developed LayerForm™️ technology to build drug delivery films with alternating drug and polymer layers. In 2013, she co-founded a biotechnology company, LayerBio Inc. to commercialize LayerForm™️ for regenerative medicine applications.

Hammond is a member of the board of directors for Alector, a biotech company focusing on immuno-neurology. She is also a member of the board of director for Burroughs Wellcome Fund.

Energy and fuel cells
Hammond also works on the development of polymers for use in batteries thin films of carbon microtubules that can be used in batteries, solar cells, and fuel cells. She presented research on virus-based batteries to Barack Obama in 2009.

Honors and recognitions
Hammond has received multiple honors and awards throughout her career. As a graduate student in 1992, she was awarded a Ford Foundation Dissertation Fellowship from the National Academy of Sciences. Her postdoc was supported by an NSF Postdoctoral Fellowship in Chemistry, awarded in 1994. Since joining the faculty at MIT, Hammond has amassed several plaudits, with early career highlights including an Environmental Protection Agency Early Career Research Award in 1996 and an NSF CAREER Award for Young Investigators in 1997. In 2013, Hammond was one of three African-American female fellows to be elected to the American Academy of Arts and Sciences. She was elected to the National Academy of Medicine and the National Academy of Engineering in rapid succession in 2016 and 2017, respectively, the National Academy of Sciences in 2019 and finally the National Academy of Inventors in 2021. In 2021 Hammond was also selected to be a member of the President's Council of Advisors on Science and Technology (PCAST) under President Biden.

Selected bibliography

References

External links 
 Oral History interview transcript for Paula T. Hammond on 16 December 2020, American Institute of Physics, Niels Bohr Library and Archives
 MIT - Hammond Research in the News
 TED Talk
 Featured in Women in Chemistry: Lessons from Life and the Laboratory, a television program produced by WHYY and the Science History Institute 
 Lab website
MIT Infinite History video interview
Margaret MacVicar Memorial AMITA Oral History also on MIT Dome

1963 births
Living people
Scientists from Detroit
MIT School of Engineering faculty
Georgia Tech alumni
MIT School of Engineering alumni
Fellows of the American Institute for Medical and Biological Engineering
Members of the United States National Academy of Sciences
Fellows of the National Academy of Inventors
Members of the National Academy of Medicine
Fellows of the American Physical Society
American scientists